Smoke and Mirrors: Short Fictions and Illusions is a collection of short stories and poems by Neil Gaiman. It was first published in the United States in 1998, and in the United Kingdom in 1999. The UK edition included five stories not in the US edition, four of which were included in the US edition of Fragile Things.

Many of the stories in this book are reprints from other sources, such as magazines, anthologies, and collections (including ten stories and poems from Gaiman's earlier small press miscellany Angels and Visitations).

Contents
The included stories and poems are different between some of the editions. The US, UK, and eBook editions have some differences in the stories they contain (see notes):

 Reading the Entrails - A Rondel about the pleasures and perils of fortune-telling
 The Wedding Present - A story included in the introduction
 Chivalry - A story about the Holy Grail written for an anthology by Martin H. Greenberg
 Nicholas Was... - A very short story (100 words) used for a Christmas card
 The Price - on the subject of cats, angels, and an unwanted visitor
 Troll Bridge - An adult retelling of The Three Billy Goats Gruff written for the anthology Snow White, Blood Red by Ellen Datlow and Terri Windling
 Don't Ask Jack - Inspired by a demonic jack-in-the-box sculpture by Lisa Snellings
 The Goldfish Pool and Other Stories - A brief reflection on a certain pool containing a trio of goldfish
 Eaten (Scenes from a Moving picture)
 The White Road - A narrative poem retelling some old English folktales
 Queen of Knives - A narrative poem about stage magic
 The Facts in the Case of the Departure of Miss Finch - A story about how a visit to an underground circus led to an unexpected change
 Changes - written for Lisa Tuttle about gender reflection
 The Daughter of Owls - Written in the style of John Aubrey
 Shoggoth's Old Peculiar - A pastiche of H.P. Lovecraft in which a visitor arrives at a pub and partakes in a jovially mysterious conversation and an eldritch concoction 
 Virus - Written for the anthology Digital Dreams by David Barrett about computer fiction
 Looking for the Girl - Commissioned by Penthouse for their 20th anniversary issue
 Only the End of the World Again 
 Bay Wolf - A story poem retelling Beowulf as a futuristic episode of Baywatch
 Fifteen Painted Cards from a Vampire Tarot  - A series of short stories titled by each card of the Major Arcana
 We Can Get Them For You Wholesale - An assassin's tale 
 One Life, Furnished in Early Moorcock - Written for an anthology of Elric stories by Michael Moorcock
 Cold Colors - Inspired by computers and black magic
 The Sweeper of Dreams - Inspired by a Lisa Snellings statue
 Foreign Parts
 Vampire Sestina - A poem originally published in Fantasy Tales and later reprinted in the Mammoth Book of Vampires by Stephen Jones
 Mouse - A short story inspired by Raymond Carver and written for Touch Wood, edited by Pete Crowther
 The Sea Change
 How Do You Think It Feels? - A man recalls his first sexual encounter with a supernatural twist
 When We Went to See the End of the World by Dawnie Morningside, age 11¼ - A brief short told from the point-of-view of a young child at what might be the last picnic her family will ever have
 Desert Wind - Written for Robin Anders of Boiled in Lead to accompany one of his tracks
 Tastings - Included in the anthology of erotic fantasy stories, Sirens by Ellen Datlow and Terri Windling
 In the End - A reversal of the story of the Genesis creation narrative
 Babycakes - Written to include in a benefit for PETA
 Murder Mysteries - A detective story written for the anthology Midnight Graffiti by Jessie Horsting
 Snow, Glass, Apples - A familiar story told from a different perspective

Translations
Dym i lustra (Polish), 
 Дым и Зеркала [Dym i Zerkala] (Russian)
Fumaça e Espelhos (Portuguese), 
Tükör és Füst (Hungarian), 
Die Messerkönigin (German),  (named after the translated title of the included short story Queen of Knives); also released a 3-disc audio-book of the same title (containing 6 of the short stories), 
עשן ומראות [Ashan VeMar'ot] (Hebrew)

Notes

References

1998 short story collections
Short story collections by Neil Gaiman